Rooden Reservoir is a reservoir in the Piethorne Valley in the  Metropolitan Borough of Rochdale, within Greater Manchester, England. It is close to Denshaw in the Metropolitan Borough of Oldham.

References

Reservoirs in Greater Manchester